Muhamad Ridwan (born 13 June 2000) is an Indonesian professional footballer who plays as a forward for Liga 1 club Dewa United, on loan from club Persik Kediri.

Club career

Sriwijaya
He was signed for Sriwijaya to play in Liga 1 in the 2018 season.

Persela Lamongan
In 2019, Ridwan signed a one-year contract with Indonesian Liga 1 club Persela Lamongan. He made his debut on 22 May 2019 in a match against Persipura Jayapura in the Liga 1. On 22 May 2019, Ridwan scored his first goal for Persela Lamongan against Persipura Jayapura in the 81st minute at the Surajaya Stadium, Lamongan.

PSIS Semarang
He was signed for PSIS Semarang to play in Liga 1 in the 2020 season. This season was suspended on 27 March 2020 due to the COVID-19 pandemic. The season was abandoned and was declared void on 20 January 2021.

Persik Kediri
In 2021, Ridwan signed a one-year contract with Indonesian Liga 1 club Persik Kediri. He made his league debut on 28 November 2021 in a match against Persebaya Surabaya at the Manahan Stadium, Surakarta. On 3 December 2021, Ridwan scored his first goal for Persik against Persita Tangerang in the 83rd minute at the Sultan Agung Stadium, Bantul.

Loan to Dewa United
Muhamad Ridwan became Dewa United's in half of the 2022–23 Liga 1. Ridwan made his debut on 14 January 2023 in a match against Persis Solo at the Indomilk Arena, Tangerang.

International career
Ridwan was part of the Indonesia under-23 team that won Bronze in the 2021 Southeast Asian Games in Vietnam.

Career statistics

Club

International goals 
International under-23 goals

Honours

International 
Indonesia U-23
 Southeast Asian Games  Bronze medal: 2021

References

External links
 Muhamad Ridwan at Soccerway
 Muhamad Ridwan at Liga Indonesia

2000 births
Living people
Indonesian footballers
Liga 1 (Indonesia) players
Sriwijaya F.C. players
Persela Lamongan players
PSIS Semarang players
Persik Kediri players
Association football forwards
People from Kendal Regency
Sportspeople from Central Java
Indonesia youth international footballers
Competitors at the 2021 Southeast Asian Games
Southeast Asian Games bronze medalists for Indonesia
Southeast Asian Games medalists in football